Alyson Croft (born June 5, 1975) is an American actress. She has been nominated for best Young Artist Award three times, winning it twice during the late 1980s.

Notable film appearances include the role of McNulty's ancestor in Trancers and Trancers II, and Brooke in two episodes of Family Ties.  In 2009, she had a brief role on 24.

References

External links
 

1975 births
American child actresses
American film actresses
American television actresses
Living people
Place of birth missing (living people)
21st-century American women